Dmitry Nekrashevich (born 26 August 2001) is a Belarusian professional footballer who plays for Isloch Minsk Raion.

On the day of his professional debut for Isloch Minsk Raion, he set the new record as the youngest ever player to play in Belarusian Premier League.

References

External links 
 
 

2001 births
Living people
Belarusian footballers
Association football forwards
FC Isloch Minsk Raion players
FC Naftan Novopolotsk players